Brigitte Sylvia Mabandla (born 23 November 1948) is the South African Ambassador to Sweden (she presented her credentials on 16 January 2020) and was a member of the African National Congress' National Executive Council, she was formerly the South African minister of public enterprises; minister of justice and constitutional development (29 April 2004 – 25 September 2008).

In 1979, she graduated with an LLB degree in law from the University of Zambia.

References

1948 births
Living people
Justice ministers of South Africa
University of Zambia alumni
Members of the National Assembly of South Africa
African National Congress politicians
Women government ministers of South Africa
Female justice ministers
Women members of the National Assembly of South Africa
Ambassadors to Sweden
South African women ambassadors